Mariya Grabovetskaya (born 10 April 1987) is a female weightlifter from Kokshetau, Kazakhstan.

Career
She won the silver medal at the 2007 Junior World Championships, with a total of 277 kg.

At the 2008 Summer Olympics she initially won the bronze medal in the +75 kg category, with a total of 270 kg.  On 17 November 2016 the IOC disqualified her from the 2008 Olympic Games, stripped her Olympic medal and struck her results from the record for failing a drugs test in a re-analysis of her doping sample from 2008.

References

External links
 Athlete Biography at beijing2008

1987 births
Living people
Sportspeople from Kokshetau
People from Kokshetau
Competitors stripped of Summer Olympics medals
Kazakhstani female weightlifters
Weightlifters at the 2008 Summer Olympics
Olympic weightlifters of Kazakhstan
Asian Games medalists in weightlifting
Weightlifters at the 2006 Asian Games
Weightlifters at the 2010 Asian Games
Weightlifters at the 2014 Asian Games
Asian Games silver medalists for Kazakhstan
Asian Games bronze medalists for Kazakhstan
Doping cases in weightlifting
Kazakhstani sportspeople in doping cases

Medalists at the 2010 Asian Games
Medalists at the 2014 Asian Games
21st-century Kazakhstani women